ServSafe is a food and beverage safety training and certificate program administered by the U.S. National Restaurant Association. The program is accredited by ANSI and the Conference for Food Protection. It is considered a system that aims to prevent foodborne illnesses based on a set of guidelines to improve safety and hygiene in the food preparation process.

Sanitation certification is required by most restaurants as a basic credential for their management staff. To date over 5 million ServSafe Food Protection Manager Certifications have been awarded.

Content
ServSafe Essentials Seventh Edition is the latest edition of the program. The course discusses foodborne illnesses, including information on specific foodborne pathogens and biological toxins, such as shellfish poisoning, contamination, and food allergens. Prevention is also covered, with information regarding purchasing and receiving guidelines, food preparation, holding, and serving guidelines, food safety management systems, sanitation guidelines for facilities and equipment, and integrated pest control, as well as food safety regulations and employee training.

Certifications
The various certifications that ServSafe offers are the following: ServSafe Food Manager Certification, ServSafe Food Handler Certification, ServSafe Alcohol Certification, ServSafe Allergens Certification, and the ServSafe Workplace Certification.

Examinations
In order to pass all of the ServSafe examinations, one must receive a score of 70% or higher. For the Managers Examination, at least 60 out of 80 questions must be answered correctly. The examination contains 10 extra questions that serve for research purposes only. For the Alcohol Examination, at least 30 out of 40 questions must be answered correctly. For the ServSafe Alcohol Advanced Examination, which is proctored, one must receive a score of 80% or higher, by answering at least 56 out of 70 questions correctly. Lastly, for the Food Handler Examination, one must receive a 75% by answering 30 out of the 40 questions correctly.

References

External links

Food safety in the United States
National Restaurant Association
Professional titles and certifications